Virginia's 31st House of Delegates district election, 2003, held 4 November 2003, was a contest between incumbent Republican Scott Lingamfelter and Democratic challenger David G. Brickley, who had served as director of the Virginia Department of Conservation and Recreation under Governor James S. Gilmore III.

Results

See also
Virginia's 31st House of Delegates district

References

2003 Virginia elections